French folklore encompasses the fables, folklore,
fairy tales and legends of the French people.

In the Middle Ages
Occitan literature - were songs, poetry and literature in Occitan in what is nowadays the South of France that originated in the poetry of the 11th and 12th centuries, and inspired vernacular literature throughout medieval Europe. These early recorded songs, poetry and their highest development in the 12th century and includes the well known Songs of the Troubadours:

Songs of the Troubadours
 Songs of the Troubadour - The songs, poetry and narratives of the troubadours, who were composers and performers during the High Middle Ages, flourished during the 11th century and spread throughout Europe from Southern France. Their songs dealt mainly with themes of chivalry and courtly love. Several established categories of poetry and song were:
Canso or canson were songs concerning courtly love.
Sirventes songs covered war, politics, morality, satire, humor, and topics outside of love.
Tenso and Partiment is a dialog or debate between poets
Planh is a lament on a death.
Pastorela is a song trying to win the affections and love of a shepherdess.
Alba is complaint of lovers upon parting.

Songs of the Trouvère
Songs of the Trouvère are songs and poetry that stemmed from poet-composers who were roughly contemporary with and influenced by the troubadours but who composed their works in the northern dialects of France.

Epic narratives
A second form of legend in France during the Middle Ages was epic poetry, partly historical and partly legend with themes covering the formation of France, war, kingship, and important battles. This genre was known as chansons de geste which is Old French for "songs of heroic deeds." It is also called the epics of the "Matter of France":

Matter of France
Chanson de geste: Matter of France was part history and part legendary heroic epic tales of Charlemagne and the history and founding of France by the Franks. Some of the legendary and notable topics were:
 Charlemagne, the mythological king
 Battle of Roncevaux Pass
 Bayard - the legendary horse
 Durandal - a magical sword
 Song of Roland (in French: Chanson de Roland)
Describes Roland - the chief paladin of Charlemagne
 Huon of Bordeaux written circa 1215-1240
Includes very early descriptions of: Morgan le Fay, and son Oberon
 Renaud de Montauban - epic hero

Animal fables, mock epics
Another folkloric medium in the Middle Ages were fables, mock epics and animal folk tales, notably:

 Reynard Le Roman de Renart (circa 1175) by Perrout de Saint Cloude, a mock epic, the first known appearance of the following animals:
 Reynard the fox in literature and folklore, an anthropomorphic fables of a fox, trickster
 Bruin the Bear
 Baldwin the Ass
 Tibert (Tybalt) the Cat
 Hirsent the She-wolf

Satirical tales by Rabelais
François Rabelais, 1494–1553, wrote:
 Gargantua and Pantagruel - the story of two giants

Fairy tales 
French fairy tales are particularly known by their literary rather than their folk, oral variants.  Perrault derived almost all his tales from folk sources, but rewrote them for the upper-class audience, removing rustic elements.  The précieuses rewrote them even more extensively for their own interests.  Collection of folk tales as such only began about 1860, but was fruitful for the next decades.

Fairy tales by Perrault 
Charles Perrault (1628–1703) collected tales:
 Bluebeard
 Cinderella (in 1697)
 Diamonds and Toads
 Donkey Skin
 Little Red Riding Hood (Le Petit Chaperon Rouge in 1697)
 Mother Goose Tales (Contes de ma mère l'Oye in 1695)
 Puss in Boots (in 1697)

Fairy tales by d'Aulnoy
Marie Catherine d'Aulnoy, 1650/1–1705, collected tales: 
From Fairy Tales (Les Contes des Fees) (1697)
Babiole
Cunning Cinders (Finette Cendron)
Graciosa and Percinet (Gracieuse et Percinet)
Princess Mayblossom (La Princesse Printaniere)
Princess Rosette (La Princesse Rosette)
The Bee and the Orange Tree (L'Oranger et l'Abeille)
The Benevolent Frog or The Frog and the Lion Fairy (La Grenouille bienfaisante)
The Blue Bird (L'Oiseau bleu)
The Dolphin
The Fortunate One or Felicia and the Pot of Pinks (Fortunée)
The Imp Prince (Le Prince Lutin)
The Little Good Mouse (La bonne petite souris)
The Ram or The Wonderful Sheep (Le Mouton )
The Story of Pretty Goldilocks or The Beauty with Golden Hair (La Belle aux cheveux d'or)
The Yellow Dwarf (Le Nain jaune)
The White Doe or The Doe in the Woods (La Biche au bois)
From ''New Tales, or Fairies in Fashion (Contes Nouveaux ou Les Fees a la Mode) (1698)
Belle-Belle (Belle-Belle ou Le Chevalier Fortuné)
Green Serpent (Serpentin vert)
Puddocky or The White Cat (La Chatte Blanche)
The Golden Branch (Le Rameau d'Or)
The Pigeon and the Dove (Le Pigeon et la Colombe)
Prince Marcassin (Le Prince Marcassin)
Princess Belle-Etoile (La Princesse Belle-Étoile)

Fairy tales by Souvestre
Émile Souvestre (1806–1854) collected tales:
 The Groac'h of the Isle of Lok

Other fairy tales 

 Beauty and the Beast - first published version by Gabrielle-Suzanne Barbot de Villeneuve, 1740.
 The Enchanted Apple Tree
 The Goblin Pony - translated in Grey Fairy Book by Andrew Lang, 1900.
 Quackling or Drakestail (Bout-d’-Canard) - original in Affenschwanz et Cetera, by Charles Marelle 1888, translated in Red Fairy Book by Andrew Lang, 1890.
 The Wizard King - original in Les Fees Illustres, translated in Yellow Fairy Book by Andrew Lang, 1894.

Legends of people
 Lancelot-Grail (Prose Lancelot)
 The Account of Nicolas Flamel

Legendary creatures 
 Beast of Gévaudan
 Brownie of the Lake
 Cheval Gauvin (horse)
 Cheval Mallet - A fabulous and evil horse that appears at night and tempts exhausted travelers into riding it, only to take off with the rider never to be seen again.
 Dahu
 Dames Blanches, type of female spirit
 European dragon
 Fae - aka Fae, Fée, the origin of the word Fairy
 Gap of Goeblin - is a "goblin hole", the legend that surrounds a hole and tunnel in Mortain, France.
 Gargouille - A legendary dragon
 Gargoyle - A beast
 Goblins
 Lutins - A type of hobgoblin
 Matagot - A spirit in the form of an animal, usually a cat
 Melusine -  A feminine spirit of fresh waters
 Morgan le Fay (Morgue le Faye) - In the early Legends of Charlemagne, she is most famous for her association with Ogier the Dane, whom she takes to her mystical island palace to be her lover. In Huon de Bordeaux, Morgan le Fay and Julius Caesar are the parents of Oberon.
 Oberon - King of the Fairies. In the early Legends of Charlemagne, Huon de Bordeaux he is the son of Morgan le Faye and Julius Caesar.
 Reynard - A trickster fox. See also Animal fables, mock epics.
 Tarasque - A legendary dragon
 Werewolf
 Woodwose (aka Homme Sauvage,, Wadwasa and Wild Man)

Other folklore
 Bear games
 La Femme Aux Serpents
 Feu follet
 Feulates
 King Ursus
 Marianne - a national emblem of France
 Rayarcus
 Rogero
 Les Tribulations de l’Ours Martin
 Wild Hunt

See also
French mythology

References

Bibliography 
 Bonner, Anthony, ed. Songs of the Troubadours. New York:  Schocken Books, 1972.
Legends and Romances of Brittany by Lewis Spence 1917

 
Folklore